The 1991 Nutri-Metics Bendon Classic was a women's tennis tournament played on outdoor hard courts at the ASB Tennis Centre in Auckland in New Zealand that was part of Tier V of the 1991 WTA Tour. It was the sixth edition of the tournament and was held from 28 January until 3 February 1991. Unseeded Eva Švíglerová won the singles title and earned $18,000 first-prize money.

Finals

Singles
 Eva Švíglerová defeated  Andrea Strnadová 6–2, 0–6, 6–1
 It was Švíglerová's only WTA singles title of her career.

Doubles
 Patty Fendick /  Larisa Neiland defeated  Jo-Anne Faull /  Julie Richardson 6–3, 6–3

Prize money

See also
 1991 Benson and Hedges Open – men's tournament

References

External links
 ITF tournament edition details
 Tournament draws

Nutri-Metics Bendon Classic
WTA Auckland Open
Nutri
ASB
ASB
1991 in New Zealand tennis